Board of Governors, FRS v. Investment Company Institute, 450 U.S. 46 (1981), was a decision by the United States Supreme Court, which held that the amendment to Regulation Y does not exceed the Board's statutory authority.

See also
List of United States Supreme Court cases, volume 450
Glass–Steagall Act
Bloomberg L.P. v. Board of Governors of the Federal Reserve System

Further reading

External links
 

United States Supreme Court cases
United States Supreme Court cases of the Burger Court
United States banking case law
1981 in United States case law
Federal Reserve System